FPGS may refer to:
 Folylpolyglutamate synthase, an enzyme
 Tetrahydrofolate synthase, an enzyme